Gustavo Antonio "Tav" Falco is an American-born musician, performance artist, filmmaker, actor, author, photographer, and dancer. Falco has fronted the rock band Tav Falco's Panther Burns since 1979, and founded a parallel solo career that incorporates other styles such as cabaret, tango, and vocal jazz. He has directed one feature film and numerous short films, and has played minor acting roles in motion pictures filmed in both North America and Europe. He is the author of two books, one a psychography of the city of Memphis, and the other a collection of his photography.

Biography
Falco was born in Philadelphia, Pennsylvania to a family of Italian descent but grew up in rural southwest Arkansas between Whelen Springs and Gurdon. After studying theater and film at the University of Arkansas in Fayetteville, Falco moved to Memphis in 1973. In the mid-1970s, he started the nonprofit Televista "art-action" video group with fellow Arkansas poet/performance artist/videographer Randall Lyon to create art and to document local musicians and artists. While with Televista, Falco worked with and trained in photography and filmmaking under Memphis color photographer William Eggleston.

In 1978, Alex Chilton teamed up with Falco after being impressed by Falco's performance of the song "Bourgeois Blues" at The Orpheum Theatre in Memphis, which culminated in the chainsawing of an electric guitar. The two founded the self-styled "art damage" rock and roll band Tav Falco's Panther Burns in 1979. The group was named after lore surrounding a plantation in Mississippi. The Panther Burns' debut album, Behind The Magnolia Curtain, was recorded at Ardent Studios in Memphis and released by Rough Trade Records. A December 3, 1980, session recorded at Sam Phillips Recording Service was released in 1992 on Marilyn Records as The Unreleased Sessions. Falco moved to New York in 1981, and released his official follow-up album, Blow Your Top, on Chris Stein's Animal Records imprint, which was distributed by Chrysalis Records.

Tav Falco's Panther Burns celebrated its 40th anniversary in 2019 with a tour dubbed the "40th Anniversary Howl", with its prime show taking place May 21 of that year in Memphis at Lafayette's Music Room.

Falco devoted portions of his musical career to highlighting traditional regional artists from Memphis and Mississippi who had not gained media attention. He filmed a black & white short film of blues artist R.L. Burnside performing at Brotherhood Sportsmen's Lodge in Como, Mississippi, on September 28, 1974. After assembling The Panther Burns, Falco performed and collaborated with legacy rockabilly and blues performers such as Charlie Feathers, James Luther Dickinson, and Cordell Jackson. His photography was used for the Charlie Feathers album Honky Tonk Man (New Rose Records, 1988).

Falco would also promote and work with lesser-known regional contemporaries. His record imprint, Frenzi Records, released a 1986 compilation of area artists entitled Swamp Surfing in Memphis, as well as a 1988 studio EP by female-led group The Hellcats. These records received respective international distribution from Au Go Go Records (Australia) and New Rose Records (France).

In 2014, Falco compiled a double album of some of his favorite tracks from his music collection, Tav Falco's Wild & Exotic World of Musical Obscurities, which was released on Stag-O-Lee Records. The album set included a cover song by The Panther Burns and liner notes by Falco.

In the 1990s, Falco relocated from the United States to Paris, and then to Vienna, where he lived for nearly two decades. In January 2022, he located to Bangkok, where he currently resides. Often Falco has claimed his main artistic purpose is "to stir up the dark waters of the unconscious."

Work in films

As filmmaker
Starting in the 1970s, Falco created a number of short films on varying topics focusing on "underground" art-actions and cultural assets around the mid-American South. The Cinémathèque Française in Paris accepted and archived six of Falco's short films into its permanent collection. Among the titles archived are Masque of Hôtel Orient, Born Too Late, Helene of Memphis, Memphis Beat, Shadetree Mechanic, and 71 Salvage. A selection of Falco's short films were shown in a retrospective at the Cinémathèque Française in 2006, with Falco himself in attendance.

Urania Descending, the first feature film directed by Falco, was completed in 2014 and released in 2016 by Lamplighter Films. The film consists of portions of what is intended to be a be a film trilogy. As of October 2021, Falco is editing the full Urania trilogy.

In addition to the Cinémathèque Française, Falco's film work has been screened at The Horse Hospital, London; the David Lynch-designed Silencio Cinema, Paris; Anthology Film Archives, New York; Roxie Theater, San Francisco; Oxford Film Festival, Mississippi; Austria Film Archiv Metrokino, Vienna; and by the American Cinematheque in the Steven Spielberg Cinema at the Egyptian Theatre in Hollywood.

As actor
Falco appeared as an actor with minor roles in the feature films Great Balls of Fire!, A nagy postarablás (The Great Post Office Robbery), Highway 61, Downtown 81, and Wayne County Rambling. 

Downtown 81 was shot in New York in 1981 and was directed by Edo Bertoglio. The film starred artist Jean-Michel Basquiat and featured Debbie Harry, James Chance, Arto Lindsay, and August Darnell in supporting roles. Falco was featured in a cameo role shot on Super 16mm film, where he created and then recited improvised dialogue with Basquiat. Basuqiat hated the dialogue so much he walked off the set. Initially abandoned, the film was released by Metrograph Pictures in 2000.

After taking an interest in tango dancing in the 1990s and devoting time to studying the dance in Buenos Aires, Falco appeared as a tanguero in the 2003 film Dans Le Rouge du Couchant.

As author
Falco has collaborated with Erik Morse, an American underground author, music writer and journalist, on a two-volume book series about the city of Memphis entitled Mondo Memphis. Falco's book, Ghosts Behind The Sun: Splendor, Enigma, and Death/Mondo Memphis: Volume 1, is a 450-page encyclopedic history and psychography of Memphis, beginning well before the Civil War and moving forward to more recent autobiographical accounts set in that city. Morse's Bluff City Underground/Mondo Memphis: Volume 2 roman noir follows a West Coast graduate student and his encounters with a Memphis secret society.

In 2015, Falco's book of photography, a collection of black & white images of the American South entitled Iconography of Chance: 99 Photographs of the Evanescent South, was published by Elsinore Press and distributed by University of Chicago Press.

As solo musician

After moving to Vienna, Falco took an interest in tango, cabaret, and similar continental musical styles. The 1995 Tav Falco & The Panther Burns album Shadow Dancer introduced these influences to his music. In 1996, he released two 10" LP releases, Disappearing Angels and 2  Sides of Tav Falco, under the "Tav Falco" name.

 In 2016, Falco released the holiday-themed album A Tav Falco Christmas on the Los Angeles-based record label ORG Music. Recorded at Sam Phillips Recording Service, the album featured Mike Watt on bass, and was produced by guitarist Mario Monterosso. The Los Angeles Times called it "gloriously demented enough to act as a tonic for anyone who can't bear the thought of another dose of sugary sentimentality." A track from the album, "Santa Claus is Back in Town," was included on the 2021 digital compilation album XO for the Holidays, Vol. X.

Also in 2016, while on a European tour, Falco recorded the single "The Drone Ranger" b/w "Tram?" with producer Sterling Roswell. The single was released in February 2017 on the Blang! label.

In a 2018 interview with Adam J. Harmer of the British indie rock group Fat White Family, Falco stated, "I'm getting away from the rock and roll world to get a little peace of mind." In April of that year, Falco recorded the sessions that would become the album Cabaret of Daggers at Terminal 2 Studio in Rome, with Mario Monterosso producing once again. Two of the album's songs, including the anthemic "Red Vienna," are Falco originals. The remainder includes selections from the Great American Songbook such as "Strange Fruit" and "Born to Be Blue," and veers far enough away from The Panther Burns' signature sound that Falco opted to present it as a solo album, despite Panther Burns members being featured prominently on the album. Cabaret of Daggers was released by ORG Music on limited edition yellow vinyl on Record Store Day on November 23, and on black vinyl and digital formats on November 30. Mojo magazine stated that the album "conjures up a potent mix of blues, jazz and tango rhythms in which 1920s Vienna café culture seamlessly rubs shoulders with Beale Street juke joints," and rated the album four stars out of five.

Falco and producer Monterosso performed with British television and radio personality Jools Holland on BBC Radio 2's The Jools Holland Show on December 15, 2019.

In 2020, during the COVID-19 pandemic, Falco began a musical collaboration with Mike Watt at the latter's suggestion. The project developed into a five-song EP entitled Club Car Zodiac, which featured Watt as well as other performers such as The Stooges percussionist Lawrence Mullins (aka Toby Dammit) and Argentine surf guitarist Didi Wray. The album was produced by Mario Monterosso. Club Car Zodiac was released as a purple vinyl 12" 45 RPM EP on Record Store Day Black Friday, November 26, 2021.

Works

Filmography

Bibliography

Solo discography

Notes

References
 Gordon, Robert (1995). It Came From Memphis. New York: Pocket Books. .
 Hart, Gabe. (November 10, 2011). "Tav Falco: Sexual, Abandoned, Political". L.A. Record. Retrieved July 30, 2014.
 Jordan, Mark (February 11, 1999). Midnight in Memphis. Memphis Flyer (archived at archive.org). Retrieved October 3, 2021.
 MONDO MEMPHIS: TAV FALCO & ERIK MORSE website by Creation Books (archived at archive.org from original MONDO MEMPHIS page by Creation Books). Retrieved July 29, 2014.
 Needs, Kris. (November 17, 2014). "Vienna And Voodoo: Tav Falco Interviewed". The Quietus. Retrieved March 31, 2015. 
 O'Brien, Glenn (August 1988). Memphis Blues Again; Tennessee's Most Evasive R&B Man – Tav Falco of Panther Burns. Interview magazine, pp. 50–51.
 Stephenson, Will. (November 21, 2014). "Tav Falco on his new Arkansas-set film, 'Urania Descending'". Arkansas Times. Retrieved March 31, 2015.
 Turner, Jeremy (December 2003). "07: Interview With Tav Falco About Early Telematic Art at Televista in Memphis, New Center for Art Activities in New York and Open Space Gallery in Victoria, Canada." Outer Space: The Past, Present and Future of Telematic Art (archived at archive.org). Retrieved October 3, 2021.

External links

Tav Falco Official Website

[ Tav Falco biography at Allmusic]
Official site of Urania film trilogy by Tav Falco

Living people
American male actors
American performance artists
People from Clark County, Arkansas
American rockabilly guitarists
American rock singers
American people of Italian descent
Musicians from Philadelphia
Singers from Arkansas
1945 births
Tav Falco's Panther Burns members